John Walter "Cap" Oehler (born August 5, 1910 – May 12, 1983) was an American football center in the National Football League (NFL).  He was a charter member of the Pittsburgh Pirates (which would later be renamed the Steelers).
Oehler was born in Queens, New York. He played college football at Purdue University where he was named a captain.

In  Oehler joined the newly formed Pittsburgh Pirates of the NFL. In the team's first game, he blocked a punt which went out the back of the end zone resulting in a safety. Those were the first points recorded in franchise history and the lone points in that first 23–2 loss. He would play two years for the Pirates before moving on to the Brooklyn Dodgers where he played two more seasons.

After leaving football, he built a career in sales with shipbuilder Dravo Corporation.

References

1910 births
Sportspeople from Queens, New York
Players of American football from New York City
American football offensive linemen
American football defensive linemen
Purdue Boilermakers football players
Pittsburgh Pirates (football) players
Brooklyn Dodgers (NFL) players
1983 deaths